Kate Phillips (born 21 May 1989) is a British actress. She became famous for her role as Jane Seymour in the successful miniseries Wolf Hall (2015). She subsequently appeared in the miniseries War & Peace (2016), the first season of the television series The Crown (2016), and last three seasons of the television series Peaky Blinders (2016–2022). In 2019, she appeared as Princess Mary in the film Downton Abbey. Since 2020, she has appeared as Eliza Scarlet, the series lead, in the Victorian era crime drama, Miss Scarlet and The Duke.

Biography
After spending three years studying at Leeds University, Phillips secured a place at The Guildhall School of Music and Drama in London. After graduation she returned to Leeds to appear as Abigail Williams in The Crucible at the  West Yorkshire Playhouse. By this time she had already filmed her scenes for the BBC's adaptation of Wolf Hall in which she played Jane Seymour, a role she had been offered whilst still studying at Guildhall. There was some mild controversy following the initial airing of Wolf Hall after some historians described Philips as 'too pretty' to play Henry VIII's third wife. This criticism was disregarded by several critics who praised Philips' performance with Screen Daily naming her as a 'Star of Tomorrow'. She went on to secure roles in War & Peace, Peaky Blinders and The Crown.

An August 2018 announcement indicated that Phillips would be among the new cast to join the original actors in the feature film Downton Abbey which started principal photography at about the same time. In 2020 Phillips took on the lead role in the detective series Miss Scarlet and the Duke.

Filmography

References

External links
 

Living people
British television actresses
British stage actresses
1989 births